South Avalon-Burin oceanic barrens is a taiga ecoregion located within the Canadian province of Newfoundland and Labrador and the French overseas collectivity of Saint Pierre and Miquelon. It is defined by the World Wildlife Fund (WWF) categorization system as inhabiting the southern headlands of the Avalon and Burin Peninsulas along the southeastern coast of Newfoundland.

Climate
This ecoregion features a predominantly subarctic climate (Köppen Dfc) with cold winters and cool, foggy summers. The area around Mistaken Point features a milder subpolar oceanic climate (Köppen Cfc) with relatively mild winters and cool summers. Precipitation occurs year-round, with a mean annual precipitation between 1200 and 1500 mm.

Ecology

Flora
This ecoregion supports dense carpets of moss and fruticose lichen, along with low-growing ericaceous shrubs and wildflowers. Small communities of dwarf balsam fir can be found in some upland regions.

The moss-heath plant associations of this ecoregion, dominated by blanket bogs and Racomitrium heath, are unique in North America. Its closest affinities found in the oceanic climates of Iceland and northern Scotland.

Fauna
Characteristic wildlife include caribou, willow ptarmigan, Atlantic puffin, and variety of seabird species. Cape St. Mary's hosts one of the world's largest colonies of Northern gannet.

Conservation
Despite being underrepresented, about 95% of this ecoregion remains ecologically intact. Some notable protected areas include Cape St. Mary's Ecological Reserve, Chance Cove Provincial Park, and Mistaken Point Ecological Reserve.

See also
List of ecoregions in Canada (WWF)
List of ecoregions in France

References

External links

Ecozones and ecoregions of Newfoundland and Labrador
Nearctic ecoregions
Temperate coniferous forests
Environment of Saint Pierre and Miquelon
Geography of Saint Pierre and Miquelon